In Context Music is an electro-acoustic music and electronic music record label established in 2013. Based in New York City, it is curated by Australian artist Angus Tarnawsky.

Artists

Catalogue

References

External links
 Official Site

Record labels established in 2013
Electronic music record labels